Rosen Zlatanov Vladimirov is a former regional governor of Sofia, Bulgaria, being in that position during the mayoralties of Stefan Sofianski and Mincho Gerdzhikov.

Since 2005 he has been the member of the National Assembly for the Targovishte constituency and parliamentary deputy chairman of the Movement for Rights and Freedoms

References

Members of the National Assembly (Bulgaria)
Living people
Year of birth missing (living people)